The 2013–14 season was Corona Braşov's first season in Liga I, the top division of Romanian football.

Background

Transfers

In

Out

Competitions

Liga I

Results summary

Results by round

Squad statistics

Appearances and goals

 
 

|}

References 

ASC Corona Brașov seasons
Corona Brasov season